Hewitsonia boisduvalii, the large tiger blue, is a butterfly in the family Lycaenidae. It is found in Guinea, Liberia, Ivory Coast, Ghana, Nigeria (south and the Cross River loop), Cameroon, Gabon, the Republic of the Congo and the Central African Republic. The habitat consists of primary and secondary forests with a closed canopy.

Subspecies
Hewitsonia boisduvalii boisduvalii (Guinea: Nimba Mountains, Liberia, Ivory Coast, Ghana, Nigeria, Cameroon, Gabon, Congo, Central African Republic)
Hewitsonia boisduvalii borealis Schultze, 1916 (southern Nigeria, Cameroon)

References

Butterflies described in 1869
Poritiinae
Butterflies of Africa
Taxa named by William Chapman Hewitson